John C. Kelley (sometimes credited as John Kelley) is an American television writer and producer who formerly served as a supervising producer on the acclaimed Fox medical drama House (2004–12).

Career 
Kelley's career in entertainment began when he wrote and directed a short film entitled The Yellow Badge of Courage in 1999. In 2001 he served as a producer and writer on a television special entitled Earthship.TV, a display of footage from filmmaker James Cameron's expedition to the wreck of the R.M.S. Titanic. From 2003-2007 he served as a writer and producer on the CBS crime series NCIS, writing or co-writing sixteen episodes during this time. In 2010 he wrote a freelance episode of House, which aired as part of its sixth season. He was brought aboard as a staff writer at the beginning of season seven.

Television work

NCIS episodes 
 1.03: "Sea Dog" (with Donald P. Bellisario)
 1.03: "Marine Down"
 1.15: "Enigma"
 1.20: "Missing"
 2.05: "The Bone Yard"
 2.09: "Forced Entry" (with Jesse Stern)
 2.11: "Black Water" (with Juan Carlos Coto)
 2.15: "Caught on Tape" (with Chris Crowe and Gil Grant)
 2.23: "Twilight"
 3.03: "Mind Games" (with Jeffrey Kirkpatrick)
 3.04: "Silver War" (with Joshua Lurie)
 4.01: "Shalom" (with Donald Bellisario)
 4.10: "Smoked" (with Robert Palm)
 4.11: "Driven" (with Nell Scovell and Richard Arthur)
 4.15: "Friends and Lovers"
 4.19: "Grace Period"

House episodes 
 6.18: "Knight Fall"
 7.03: "Unwritten"
 7.14: "Recession Proof"
 7.17: "Fall from Grace"
 8.05: "The Confession"
 8.14: "Love Is Blind"
 8.19: "The C Word"

The Blacklist episodes 
 1.05: "The Courier (No. 85)"

References

External links 

American television writers
American male television writers
American television producers
Living people
Place of birth missing (living people)
Year of birth missing (living people)